List of Roger W. Jones Award for Executive Leadership recipients is a compilation of United States government executives who have received the Jones Award from the American University School of Public Affairs, an institution of higher education and research located in Washington, D.C. that grants academic degrees in fields such as political science, public administration, public policy, and justice, law and society. First awarded in 1978, the award has been presented every year since then to two United States federal career executives who have shown leadership in the training of federal government managers and executives and in organizational abilities.

The awards namesake, Roger W. Jones (1908 – 1993), was a federal civil servant who helped direct the Office of Management and Budget in the 1940s and 1950s. In 1978, Bernard Rosen, a former United States Civil Service Commission executive director, graduate instructor at the American University, and subsequent author of the 1984 book Holding Government Bureaucracies Accountable, helped start American University's Roger W. Jones Award for Executive Leadership in federal government. In 2002, Victor J. Ferlise, United States Army Deputy to the Commanding General, Communications Electronic Command, received the award on September 24, which marked the 25th anniversary of the award.

Award recipients

See also
 American University School of Public Affairs
 Roger W. Jones
 List of social sciences awards

References

External links
 

American awards
American University
Awards by university and college in the United States
Awards established in 1978
Civil awards and decorations
Social sciences awards
Business and industry awards
1978 establishments in the United States